John Hubert Corcoran, Jr. (January 15, 1897 – December 28, 1945) was a Massachusetts  politician who served on the Cambridge, Massachusetts City Council and as the Mayor of Cambridge, Massachusetts. 
  
Corcoran's father, John Hubert Corcoran, Sr. was a member and President of the Cambridge Common Council and the Cambridge Board of Aldermen.

Early life
Corcoran was born on January 15, 1897, to John Hubert Corcoran, Sr. and Ann M. (Ford) Corcoran.

Corcoran attended Harvard College, he graduated with an A.B. in 1918.

On April 23, 1918, Corcoran enlisted as a Private in the U.S. Coast Artillery, he was assigned to Fort Strong in Boston Harbor.  Corcoran was promoted to Corporal on June 20.  On July 4, Corcoran was assigned to the Coast Artillery Officers Training Camp, Fort Monroe, Virginia and promoted to Lieutenant.  Corcoran was later transferred to Fort McKinley, Portland, Maine and the 33rd Coast Artillery, Camp Abraham Eustis, Virginia. He was discharged on December 11, 1918.

Corcoran returned to Harvard and received an MBA in June 1920. Corcoran wrote his graduate theses on the Departmental Layout of the Proposed store of a Coöperative Society.

Political career

Mayor of Cambridge
Cambridge voters changed the city government from a strong mayor to a Plan E (City Council-City Manager) form of government, with Cambridge having a ceremonial mayor. Corcoran, a member of the Cambridge City Council in 1942 was chosen by his fellow councilors to be City's Ceremonial Mayor.

1944 U.S. Senate campaign
In 1944 Massachusetts held a special election to fill the Senate seat formerly held by Henry Cabot Lodge, Jr. Lodge had resigned from the Senate to join the Army.  Corcoran was the Democratic nominee, he lost the election to Leverett Saltonstall by more than 400,000 votes.

Death
Corcoran died unexpectedly, at age 48, from pneumonia in a Boston, Massachusetts, hospital, on December 28, 1945.

Notes

1897 births
1945 deaths
American military personnel of World War I
Harvard Business School alumni
Cambridge, Massachusetts City Council members
Massachusetts Democrats
Mayors of Cambridge, Massachusetts
Deaths from pneumonia in Massachusetts
20th-century American politicians
Harvard College alumni